The Jim Bacon Foundation is a philanthropic organisation based in Tasmania, Australia. It provides practical support and financial assistance to cancer patients and organisations that support them during their treatment. It also offers three scholarships through the University of Tasmania which are granted to students studying fine arts, political science or the care and treatment of cancer.
 
The foundation is named after Jim Bacon, who spent 25 years working in the union movement, was elected to the Tasmanian House of Assembly and became Premier of Tasmania, a position he held from 1998 until his resignation in March 2004.

The Jim Bacon Foundation was formed by passage of the Jim Bacon Foundation Act 2004 through the Tasmanian Parliament. Bacon was diagnosed with inoperable lung cancer while still serving as Premier of Tasmania, and died in June 2004, six months before the legislation received Royal Assent.

The Foundation was absorbed into the Ricky Ponting Foundation in May 2013. The State Government will continue to fund the $30,000 Jim Bacon Memorial Scholarship at the University of Tasmania.

Scholarship recipients

References

External links
Jim Bacon Foundation website

Cancer organisations based in Australia
Foundations based in Australia
Organisations based in Tasmania